Hamidabad (also Romanized as Ḩamīdābād) is a village in Fazl Rural District, in the Central District of Nishapur County, Razavi Khorasan Province, Iran. At the 2006 census, its population was 711, in 201 families.

Accessibility 
This village and the village of Fushenjan are situated next to each other and are accessible by car from the road 44 of Iran along with different routes from the Baghrud Road of Nishapur (Persian: جاده باغرود نیشابور). They are also really close to the capital city of the county, Nishapur and a road known as the Baghrud Road is used as their main pathway to the capital city.

References 

Populated places in Nishapur County